The red-faced miner bee (Andrena rufosignata) is a species of miner bee in the family Andrenidae. It is found in North America.

References

Further reading

 
 

rufosignata
Articles created by Qbugbot
Insects described in 1902